Wiktionary is a multilingual, web-based dictionary project, edited as a wiki. , Wiktionary is available in  language versions, with  active and  closed.

List

Active

Closed

Grand total

See also
List of Wikipedias

References

Dictionaries by language
Wiktionaries
Online dictionaries
Wikis